The Waiho River (traditionally the Waiau River) is a river of the West Coast region of New Zealand's South Island. Due to changes in rainfall and snow melt, the river's water flow varies greatly. In a severe rain storm on 26 March 2019, the bridge was destroyed after  of rain had fallen. The bridge and one abutment was rebuilt, and the road link reopened after 18 days. The works cost NZ$6m.

See also
List of rivers of New Zealand

References

Rivers of the West Coast, New Zealand
Westland District
Rivers of New Zealand